Ciolpani is a commune in the northwestern part of Ilfov county, Muntenia, Romania. It is composed of five villages: Ciolpani, Izvorani, Lupăria, Piscu and Țigănești.

Etymology
Its name is the plural of ciolpan, a Romanian word meaning "tree stump".

References

Communes in Ilfov County
Localities in Muntenia